Brookville is a village located within the Town of Oyster Bay in Nassau County, on the North Shore of Long Island, in New York, United States. The population was 3,465 at the time of the 2010 census. It is considered part of the greater Glen Cove area, which is anchored by the City of Glen Cove.

History 
The geographic Village of Brookville was formed in two stages. When the village was incorporated in 1931, it consisted of a long, narrow tract of land that was centered along Cedar Swamp Road (Route 107). In the 1950s, the northern portion of the unincorporated area then known as Wheatley Hills was annexed and incorporated into the village, approximately doubling the village's area to its present .

When the town of Oyster Bay purchased what is now Brookville from the Matinecocks in the mid-17th century, the area was known as Suco's Wigwam. Most pioneers were English, many of them Quakers. They were soon joined by Dutch settlers from western Long Island, who called the surrounding area Wolver Hollow, apparently because wolves gathered at spring-fed Shoo Brook to drink. For most of the 19th century, the village was called Tappentown after a prominent family. Brookville became the preferred name after the Civil War and was used on 1873 maps.

Brookville's two centuries as a farm and woodland backwater changed quickly in the early 20th century as wealthy New Yorkers built lavish mansions. By the mid-1920s, there were 22 estates, part of the emergence of Nassau's North Shore Gold Coast. One was Broadhollow, the  spread of attorney-banker-diplomat Winthrop W. Aldrich, which had a 40-room manor house. The second owner of Broadhollow was Alfred Gwynne Vanderbilt Jr., who was owner of the Belmont and Pimlico racetracks. Marjorie Merriweather Post, daughter of cereal creator Charles William Post, and her husband Edward Francis Hutton, the famous financier, built a lavish 70-room mansion on  called Hillwood.

In 1931, estate owners banded together to win village incorporation to head off what they saw as undesirable residential and commercial development in other parts of Nassau County. In 1947, the Post estate was sold to Long Island University for its C. W. Post campus. The campus is noted as the home of the Tilles Center for the Performing Arts. Also in Brookville is the DeSeversky Conference Center of the New York Institute of Technology. The center was formerly Templeton, mansion of socialite and businessman Winston Guest. Templeton was later used as one of the settings for the Dudley Moore film Arthur.

The Chapelle de St. Martin de Sayssuel, also known as the St. Joan of Arc Chapel where Joan of Arc prayed prior to engaging the English, was moved from France to Brookville in the early 20th century. It was acquired by Gertrude Hill Gavin, daughter of James J. Hill, the American railroad magnate. The chapel was dismantled stone by stone and imported from France to her Brookville estate in 1926. The chapel is now located at Marquette University in Wisconsin.

The Brookville Reformed Church, one of the oldest existing church congregations in the country, calls Brookville its home. The Brookville Church was founded by 17th century Dutch settlers.

The James Preserve is a nature preserve in Old Brookville and is the only tract of land showing the natural appearance of the village before development. Although it is in Old Brookville, it is connected to Greenvale.

In 2009, BusinessWeek dubbed Brookville the wealthiest town in America.

Geography

The village lost territory to the adjacent Incorporated Village of East Hills between the 1960 census and the 1970 census.

Demographics

As of the census of 2000, there were 2,126 people, 631 households, and 569 families residing in the village. The population density was 530.5 people per square mile (204.7/km2). There were 648 housing units at an average density of 161.7 per square mile (62.4/km2). The racial makeup of the village was 89.75% White, 1.16% African American, 3.16% Asian, 0.56% from other races, and 1.36% from two or more races. Hispanic or Latino of any race were 6.68% of the population.

There were 631 households, out of which 49.9% had children under the age of 18 living with them, 82.9% were married couples living together, 4.9% had a female householder with no husband present, and 9.8% were non-families. 7.9% of all households were made up of individuals, and 4.6% had someone living alone who was 65 years of age or older. The average household size was 3.35 and the average family size was 3.49.

In the village, the population was spread out, with 32.8% under the age of 18, 4.4% from 18 to 24, 26.0% from 25 to 44, 25.1% from 45 to 64, and 11.8% who were 65 years of age or older. The median age was 39 years. For every 100 females, there were 97.8 males. For every 100 females age 18 and over, there were 90.7 males.

The median income for a household in the village was in excess of $200,000 as was the median income for a family. Males had a median income of over $100,000 versus $60,238 for females. The per capita income for the village was $84,375. None of families or the population were below the poverty line, including none of those under age 18 or those age 65 or over.

In 2009, Brookville topped BusinessWeek's list of America's 25 wealthiest towns based on average income and net worth.

Government 
As of August 2021, the Mayor of Brookville is Daniel H. Serota, the Deputy Mayor is Caroline Z. Bazzini, and the Village Trustees are Caroline Z. Bazzini, John A. Burns, Edward J. Chesnik, and Robert D. Spina.

Education

K-12 education 
Brookville is primarily served by the Jericho Union Free School District, though portions are served by the Locust Valley Central School District.

The Long Island Lutheran Middle and High School is also located in the village.

Higher education 
Half of New York Institute of Technology's 1,050 acre Old Westbury campus is located in the Village of Brookville. 

The village is the home of LIU Post, which is the largest campus of the private Long Island University system.

Notable people
Winthrop W. Aldrich, U.S. ambassador to the United Kingdom.
Marc Anthony, singer.
Arthur Scott Burden, president of Burden Iron Works.
Joseph E. Davies, second U.S. ambassador to the Soviet Union.
Angie Dickinson, actress.
Alfred I. du Pont, inventor, philanthropist.
Prince Felix and the Royal Family of Luxembourg.
C. Z. Guest, socialite.
Frederick Edward Guest, British Cabinet minister.
Edward Francis Hutton, co-founder, E. F. Hutton & Co.
Mary McFadden, fashion designer, writer.
Dina Merrill, actress.
Marjorie Merriweather Post, philanthropist.
Cynthia Roche, socialite.
Diego Suarez, garden designer.
Percy Uris, real estate investor/builder.
Alfred Gwynne Vanderbilt Jr., owner of the Belmont and Pimlico racetracks.

References

External links

 Official website
 Pictures of Brookville's Historic Estates
 Brookville Church
 Greek Orthodox Church of the Holy Resurrection
 Village Residents Party, a political action committee

Oyster Bay (town), New York
Villages in New York (state)
Villages in Nassau County, New York